Piphilology comprises the creation and use of mnemonic techniques to remember many digits of the mathematical constant . The word is a play on the word "pi" itself and of the linguistic field of philology.

There are many ways to memorize , including the use of piems (a portmanteau, formed by combining pi and poem), which are poems that represent  in a way such that the length of each word (in letters) represents a digit. Here is an example of a piem: "Now I need a drink, alcoholic of course, after the heavy lectures involving quantum mechanics." Notice how the first word has three letters, the second word has one, the third has four, the fourth has one, the fifth has five, and so on. In longer examples, 10-letter words are used to represent the digit zero, and this rule is extended to handle repeated digits in so-called Pilish writing.

Other methods include remembering patterns in the numbers (for instance, the year 1971 appears in the first fifty digits of ) and the method of loci (which has been used to memorize  to 67,890 digits).

History

Until the 20th century, the number of digits of pi which mathematicians had the stamina to calculate by hand remained in the hundreds, so that memorization of all known digits at the time was possible.  In 1949 a computer was used to calculate π to 2,000 places, presenting one of the earliest opportunities for a more difficult challenge.

Later computers calculated pi to extraordinary numbers of digits (2.7 trillion as of August 2010), and people began memorizing more and more of the output.  The world record for the number of digits memorized has exploded since the mid-1990s, and it stood at 100,000 as of October 2006.  The previous record (83,431) was set by the same person (Akira Haraguchi) on July 2, 2005, and the record previous to that (42,195) was held by Hiroyuki Goto.
An institution from Germany provides the details of the "Pi World Ranking".

Examples in English
The most common mnemonic technique is to memorize a so-called "piem" (a wordplay on "pi" and "poem") in which the number of letters in each word is equal to the corresponding digit of π. This famous example for 15 digits has several variations, including:

How I want a drink, alcoholic of course, after the heavy chapters involving quantum mechanics! - Sir James Hopwood Jeans

Short mnemonics such as these, of course, do not take one very far down π's infinite road. Instead, they are intended more as amusing doggerel. If even less accuracy suffices, the following examples can be used:

How I wish I could recollect pi easily today!
May I have a large container of coffee, cream and sugar?

This second one gives the value of π as 3.1415926535, while the first only brings it to the second five. Indeed, many published poems use truncation instead of one of the several roundings, thereby producing a less-accurate result when the first omitted digit is greater than or equal to five. It is advantageous to use truncation in memorizing if the individual intends to study more places later on, otherwise one will be remembering erroneous digits.

Another mnemonic is:
 The point I said a blind Bulgarian in France could see
In this mnemonic the word "point" represents the decimal point itself.

Yet another example is:
How I wish I could recollect, of circle round, the exact relation Arkimedes (or Archimede) unwound.
In this example, the spelling of Archimedes is normalised to nine. Although 'Archimedes' is, today, a more correct spelling of the ancient Greek mathematician's name in English, Archimede is also often seen when this mnemonic is given, since Archimède is the more correct spelling in some languages, such as French. This mnemonic also contains a rounding error because the digit represented by the last word "Arkimedes" (9) in 3.141592653589 is followed by 7 in π, which would cause the last two digits to round up.

Longer mnemonics employ the same concept. This example created by Peter M. Brigham incorporates twenty decimal digits:
How I wish I could enumerate pi easily, since all these bullshit mnemonics prevent recalling any of pi's sequence more simply.

Poems
Some mnemonics, such as this poem which gives the three and the first 20 decimal digits, use the separation of the poem's title and main body to represent the decimal point:
 Pie
 I wish I could determine pi
 Eureka, cried the great inventor
 Christmas pudding, Christmas pie
 Is the problem's very center.

Another, more poetic version is:
Sir, I have a rhyme excelling,
In mystic power and magic spelling,
Celestial spirits elucidate,
For my own problems can't relate.

Extensions to 30 or 31 decimals of the same proceed as follows:

There are minor variations on the above rhyme, which still allow pi to be worked out correctly.  However, one variation replaces the word "lexicon's" with "lesson's" and in doing so, incorrectly indicates that the 18th digit is seven.

The logologist Dmitri Borgmann gives the following 30-word poem in his book, Language on Vacation: An Olio of Orthographical Oddities: 
Now, a moon, a lover refulgent in flight,
Sails the black silence's loneliest ellipse.
Computers use pi, the constant, when polite,
Or gentle data for sad tracking aid at eclipse.

In the fantasy book, Somewhen by David Saul, a 35-word piem both provides a description of the constant pi and the digits. The text is also laid out as a circle to provide another clue to the readers as to the purpose of the poem. In this example, the word "nothing" is used to represent the digit zero. 
It's a fact
A ratio immutable
Of circle round and width,
Produces geometry's deepest conundrum.
For as the numerals stay random,
No repeat lets out its presence,
Yet it forever stretches forth.
Nothing to eternity.
The following sonnet is a mnemonic for pi to 75 decimal places in iambic pentameter:

Now I defy a tenet gallantly
Of circle canon law: these integers
Importing circles' quotients are, we see,
Unwieldy long series of cockle burs

Put all together, get no clarity;
Mnemonics shan't describeth so reformed
Creating, with a grammercy plainly,
A sonnet liberated yet conformed.

Strangely, the queer'st rules I manipulate
Being followéd, do facilitate
Whimsical musings from geometric bard.

This poesy, unabashed as it's distressed,
Evolvéd coherent - a simple test,
Discov'ring poetry no numerals jarred.

Note that in this example, 10-letter words are used to represent the digit zero.

Other poems use sound as a mnemonic technique, as in the following poem which rhymes with the first 140 decimal places of pi using a blend of assonance, slant rhyme, and perfect rhyme:
dreams number us like pi.  runes shift.  nights rewind
daytime pleasure-piles. dream-looms create our id.
moods shift. words deviate. needs brew. pleasures rise.
time slows. too late?  wait!  foreign minds live in

us! quick-minds, free-minds, minds-we-never-mind,
unknown, gyrate! neuro-rhymes measure our 
minds, for our minds rhyme. crude ego-emanations
distort nodes. id, (whose basic neuro-spacetime rhymes),

plays its tune. space drones before fate unites
dreams’ lore to unsung measures. whole dimensions
gyrate. new number-games donate quick minds &
weave through fate’s loom. fears, hopes, digits, or devils

collide here—labor stored in gold-mines, lives, lightcone-
piles. fate loops through dreams & pleasure-looms….
Note that "dreams number us like pi" corresponds to "314159," and so on.  Sound-based mnemonic techniques, unlike pilish, do not require that the letters in each word be counted in order to recall the digits of pi.  However, where sound-based mnemonics use assonance, extra care must be taken to distinguish "nine" and "five," which contain the same vowel sound.  In this example, the author assumes the convention that zero is often called "O."

Piku

The piku follows the rules of conventional haiku (three lines of 5, 7 and 5 syllables), but with the added mnemonic trick that each word contains the same number of letters as the numerals of pi, e.g.

How I love a verse
Contrived to unhusk dryly
One image nutshell

Songs
In 2004, Andrew Huang wrote a song that was a mnemonic for the first fifty digits of pi, titled "I am the first 50 digits of pi". The first line is:
Man, I can’t - I shan’t! - formulate an anthem where the words comprise mnemonics, dreaded mnemonics for pi.
In 2013, Huang extended the song to include the first 100 digits of pi, and changed the title to "Pi Mnemonic Song".

Lengthier works
There are piphilologists who have written texts that encode hundreds or thousands of digits. This is an example of constrained writing, known as "Pilish".  For example, Poe, E.: Near a Raven represents 740 digits, Cadaeic Cadenza encodes 3,835, and Not A Wake extends to 10,000 digits.

Sound-based mnemonics
It is also possible to use the rhythm and sound of the spoken digits themselves as a memorization device. The mathematician John Horton Conway composed the following arrangement for the first 100 digits,
                         _     _   _
             3 point  1415  9265  35
                      ^ ^
              _ _  _ _    _ _   __
             8979  3238  4626  4338   3279
               **  **^^          ^^   ****
              .   _    _   __   _    _      _ . _ .
        502 884  197 169  399 375  105 820  974 944
         ^  ^                       ^  ^
                 59230 78164
                  _     _    _    _
               0628  6208  998  6280
                ^^   ^^         ^^
              .. _  .._
              34825 34211 70679,
                          ^  ^

where the accents indicate various kinds of repetition.

Another mnemonic system used commonly in the memorization of pi is the Mnemonic major system, where single numbers are translated into basic sounds. A combination of these sounds creates a word, which can then be translated back into numbers. When combined with the Method of loci, this becomes a very powerful memorization tool.

Examples in other languages

Persian

Counting the letters in each word (additionally separated by "|") gives 10 decimal places of : خرد (kherad) = 3, و (va) = 1, دانش (daanesh) = 4, و (va) = 1, آگاهی (aagaahi) = 5, ...

Hungarian

 
An interesting (not math themed) alternative:

Another alternative:
Íme a szám: a görög periféria pi betűje.
Euler meg Viète végtelen összeggel közelít értékéhez.
Lám, őt már Egyiptom, Kína, Európa is akarta, hogy
„ama kör kerülete úgy ki lehetne számlálva”.

Albanian

German
This statement yields π to twenty-two decimal places:
Wie, o dies π macht ernstlich so vielen viele Müh. Lernt immerhin, Mägdelein, leichte Verselein, wie so zum Beispiel dies dürfte zu merken sein.

English translation that doesn't encode pi:
How, oh this π seriously makes so many struggles to so many. Learn at least, girls, simple little verses, just such as this one should be memorizable.

Looser English translation that encodes pi:
Woe! O this π makes seriously so muchly many's woe.

French
The following poem composed of s consists of words each with a number of letters that yields π to 126 decimal places:

An alternative beginning:
Que j’aime à faire apprendre un nombre utile aux sages !
Glorieux Archimède, artiste ingénieur,
Toi de qui Syracuse aime encore la gloire,
Soit ton nom conservé par de savants grimoires !
...

Katharevousa (archaizing) Greek

Yielding π to 22 decimal places:

Spanish
The following piem, giving π to 31 decimal places, is well known in Argentina:

Another. This piem gives π (correctly rounded) to 10 decimal places. (If you prefer to not round π, then replace "cosmos" with "cielo".)

Irish
(7 decimal places)

Romanian
One of the Romanian versions of Pi poems is:

There is another phrase known in Romanian that will help to memorize the number by eight decimal places:
Așa e bine a scrie renumitul și utilul număr. — "This is the way to write the renowned and useful number."

Another alternative for 15 decimal places: Ion a luat o carte, biografie, în latina veche. Are cinci capitole originale clasice latinești. — "Ion has bought a book, a biography, in old latin. It has five classical original latin chapters."

Russian
In the Russian language, there is a well-known phrase in the reform of 1917 orthography of old tradition:

A more modern rhyme is:

A short approximation is: "Что я знаю о кругах?" (What do I know about circles?)

In addition, there are several nonfolklore verses that simply rhyme the digits of pi "as is"; for examples, see the Russian version of this article.

Polish
The verse of Polish mathematician Witold Rybczyński (35 decimal places): 

(Note that the dash stands for zero.)

The verse of Polish mathematician Kazimierz Cwojdziński (23 decimal places):

(12 decimal places):

(10 decimal places)

An occasionally seen verse related to Mundial Argentina and the Polish football team (30 decimal places):

Portuguese
(11 decimal places)

(8 decimal places)

Or in Brazilian Portuguese: 

A piem written in a more poetic manner:
{{Verse translation|lang=pt|
Sou o amor,o homem impetuoso da libido
Homem que ataca mulheres atraentes,
meninas pecadoras que no céu imiscuem amor, paixão, fé, desejo, tudo!
Até que idolatro com as sereias pecadoras tanta fé!
Esbeltas mulheres para o musculado,
sereias e fêmeas pecadoras
Até idolatram serpentes com ardente macho.
O viril desejará as pecadoras iníquas doravante para amar.
|
I am the love,
The impetuous man from the libido
Man who attacks attractive women,
sinful maidens who on heaven intrude love, passion, faith, desire, everything!
I even idolize with the mermaids so much faith!
Luscious women for the brawny,
sinful mermaids and females
They even idolize serpents with the burning buck.
The virile man will wish the sinful and the iniquitous henceforth to love.}}

Japanese
Japanese piphilology has countless mnemonics based on punning words with numbers. This is especially easy in Japanese because there are two or three ways to pronounce each digit, and the language has relatively few phonemes to begin with. For example, to 31 decimal places:

{|
|身||一つ||世||一つ||生||く||に||無||意||味||い||わ||く||な||く||身||ふ||み||や||読||む||似||ろ||よ||||||colspan=2|闇||に||な||く
|-
|3.|| 1 ||4 || 1 ||5 ||9||2 ||6||5 ||3||5 ||8 ||9 ||7||9 ||3||2 ||3||8 ||4 ||6||2 ||6 ||4 ||3  ||3 ||8||3||2||7||9
|-
|mi||hitotsu||yo||hitotsu||colspan=2|iku||ni||colspan=3|mu-imi||colspan=5|iwakunaku
||mi||colspan=3|fumiya||colspan=2|yomu||colspan=2|niro||yo||san||zan||colspan=2|yami
||ni||colspan=2|naku
|}

This is close to being ungrammatical nonsense, but a loose translation prioritizing word order yields:A person is one; the world is one:to live this way, it's meaningless, one says, and cries,"step on it, will ya!" then reads—be the same!Crying uncontrollably in the dark.Japanese children also use songs built on this principle to memorize the multiplication table.

Chinese

It is possible to construct piphilogical poems in Chinese by using homophones or near-homophones of the numbers zero through nine, as in the following well known example which covers 22 decimal places of π. In this example the character meaning "mountain" (山 shān) is used to represent the number "three" (三 sān), the character meaning "I" (吾 wú) is used to represent the number "five" (五 wǔ), and the characters meaning "temple" (寺 sì) and "die" (死 sǐ) are used to represent the number "four" (四 sì). Some of the mnemonic characters used in this poem, for example "kill" (殺 shā) for "three" (三 sān), "jug" (壺 hú) for "five" (五 wǔ), "happiness" (樂 lè) for "six" (六 liù) and "eat" (吃 chī) for "seven" (七 qī), are not very close phonetically in Mandarin/Putonghua.

{|
|山||巔||一||寺||一||壺||酒
|-
| shān || diān || yī || sì || yī || hú || jiǔ
|-
|3 || . || 1 || 4 || 1 || 5 || 9
|-
|爾||樂||苦||煞||吾
|-
| ěr || lè || kǔ || shā || wú
|-
|2 || 6 || 5 || 3 || 5
|-
|把||酒||吃|| ||酒||殺||爾
|-
| bǎ || jiǔ || chī || || jiǔ|| shā || ěr
|-
|8 || 9 || 7 || || 9 || 3 || 2
|-
|殺||不||死|| ||樂||爾||樂
|-
| shā || bù || sǐ || || lè || ěr || lè
|-
|3 || 8 || 4 || || 6 || 2 || 6
|}

This can be translated as:On a mountain top a temple and a jug of wine.Your happiness makes me so bitter;Take some wine and drink, the wine will kill you;If it does not kill you, I will rejoice in your happiness.Turkish

Czech
(nine decimal places) 

(12 decimal places)

(13 decimal places)

(30 decimal places)

Serbian
(16 decimal places)

Italian
(30 decimal places)

(10 decimal places)
Chi è nudo e crepa limonando la tubera, lieto lui crepa

Sanskrit

The Katapayadi System of verses is basically a system of code so that things can be defined in a way so that people can remember. The code is as follows:

With the above key in place, Sri Bharathi Krishna Tirtha in his Vedic Mathematics gives the following verse:

गोपी भाग्य मधुव्रात  श्रुङ्गिशो दधिसन्धिग  |
खलजीवित खाताव गलहालारसंधार |
If we replace the code from the above table in the above verse, here is what we get.
31 41 5926 535 89793
23846 264 33832792
That gives us π/10=0.31415926535897932384626433832792 

Slovene
The following piem gives π to 30 decimal places.

Memorization record holders

Even before computers calculated , memorizing a record number of digits became an obsession for some people. On October 3, 2006, Akira Haraguchi, a retired Japanese engineer, claimed to have recited 100,000 decimal places, but the claim was not verified by Guinness World Records.

David Fiore was an early record holder for pi memorization. Fiore's record stood as an American record for more than 27 years, which remains the longest time period for an American recordholder. He was the first person to break the 10,000 digit mark.

Suresh Kumar Sharma holds Limca Book of Records for the most decimal places of pi recited by memory. He rattled off 70,030 numbers in 17 hours 14 minutes on October 21, 2015.

See also
Mnemonist
Cadaeic Cadenza
Memory sport
Pi Day

Notes and references

External links
Pi World Ranking List
Tools for Piphilologist 
Collection of Mnemonic Devices 
Mathworld Pi Wordplay
Hatzipolakis Pi Philology v. 9.5

Pi
Science mnemonics

nl:Pi (wiskunde)#Geheugensteuntjes en dergelijke